LHS 2520, also known as Gliese 3707, is a red dwarf star in the constellation Corvus. With an apparent magnitude of 12.12, it is too faint to be seen with the unaided eye. A cool star of spectral type M3.5V, it has a surface temperature of 3024 K. The star was too faint to have had its parallax measured by the Hipparcos satellite. Earth-based measurement gives its parallax as 77.93 ± 2.41 milliarcseconds, yielding a distance of 42 ± 1 light-years.

In Popular Culture 
In Action Comics #14 (January 2013), which was published 7 November 2012, Neil Degrasse Tyson appears in the story, in which he determines that Superman's home planet, Krypton, orbited LHS 2520. Tyson assisted DC Comics in selecting a real-life star that would be an appropriate parent star to Krypton, and picked the star in Corvus, and which is the mascot of Superman's high school, the Smallville Crows.

The Star also appears as LP 734-32 in the 2014 game, Elite Dangerous.

References

Corvus (constellation)
M-type main-sequence stars
3707